Handball has been an Asian Games event since 1982 when the sport was first played in New Delhi, India.

Summary

Men

Women

Medal table

Participating nations

Men

Women

List of medalists

External links
Medallists from previous Asian Games - Handball

 
Sports at the Asian Games
Asian Games
Asian Games